Clayton Miller (born 7 October 1977) is a Canadian sports shooter. He competed in the men's skeet event at the 1996 Summer Olympics.

References

External links
 

1977 births
Living people
Canadian male sport shooters
Olympic shooters of Canada
Shooters at the 1996 Summer Olympics
Sportspeople from Toronto
Commonwealth Games medallists in shooting
Commonwealth Games gold medallists for Canada
Commonwealth Games bronze medallists for Canada
Pan American Games medalists in shooting
Pan American Games bronze medalists for Canada
Shooters at the 1999 Pan American Games
Medalists at the 1999 Pan American Games
Shooters at the 2002 Commonwealth Games
Shooters at the 2006 Commonwealth Games
20th-century Canadian people
Medallists at the 2002 Commonwealth Games
Medallists at the 2006 Commonwealth Games